Fairmount (sometimes written as Fairmount Avenue) is an MBTA Commuter Rail station in Boston, Massachusetts. It serves the Fairmount Line. It is located in the Hyde Park area, under the Fairmount Avenue overpass. It is the last stop outbound on the Fairmount Line before it joins the Franklin Line at Readville station. Fairmount station opened in 1979 during Southwest Corridor reconstruction; intended to be temporary, it eventually became a permanent stop.

History

Previous service

Service on the Fairmount Line (as the Dorchester Branch of the Norfolk County Railroad and later the New York and New England Railroad and New York, New Haven and Hartford Railroad) began in 1855 and lasted until 1944. The service included a stop named Hyde Park at Fairmount Avenue, and a stop named Fairmount (also called Glenwood) near Glenwood Avenue. During their histories, both stations were referred to both as "Hyde Park" and as "Fairmount". The grade crossings at Fairmount Avenue, and at Dana Street (Bridge Street) nearby, were replaced with road bridges in 1909.

Fairmount Line
The Dorchester Branch (also known as the Midland Route) was reopened as a bypass in November 1979 during Southwest Corridor construction, including stops at Uphams Corner, Morton Street, and Fairmount. This station was originally built at minimal cost, with small low-level platforms and no direct access to Morton Street. The station was not handicapped accessible, as service over the route was intended to be temporary. However, it was popular with residents of the communities the line passed through: by 1983, over 600 riders per day boarded at Fairmount, enough to justify service to both Fairmount and nearby Hyde Park after the end of construction.

When the Southwest Corridor reopened in October 1987, the Fairmount shuttle service was retained as the Fairmount Line.  Fairmount was the terminus of the line until it was extended to Readville on November 30, 1987.

Renovation

A major renovation of Fairmount station began in early 2003. The $7 million project, which was completed in 2004-05, added 1-car-length high platforms and ramps to the  Fairmount Avenue overpass to make the station handicapped accessible. During the construction, new temporary platforms were built slightly northeast of the station.

Uphams Corner and Morton Street stations received full-length high level platforms in renovations that finished in 2007. When Blue Hill Avenue, the last of four new stations, was completed in 2017, Fairmount and Readville became the only stations on the line without full-length high-level platforms. The MBTA wishes to eventually add high-level platforms at Fairmount to speed boarding, but there are no current plans to do so.

As part of a long-term shift of the Fairmount Line from commuter rail to a rapid transit-like service, Fairmount was shifted from Zone 1 to Zone 1A on July 1, 2013, making a trip to South Station equal to a rapid transit fare. This equalized all fares on the line except trips to/from Readville.

References

External links

MBTA – Fairmount
Google Maps Street View: from Walnut Street, from Fairmount Court, from Fairmount Avenue

MBTA Commuter Rail stations in Boston
Stations along New York and New England Railroad lines
Railway stations in the United States opened in 1979